Lincoln Park is a station on NJ Transit's Montclair-Boonton Line in the borough of Lincoln Park, Morris County, New Jersey. The station is located near the Comly Road overpass, accessible from Main Street, Station Road and Park Avenue.

History 
Railroad service in Lincoln Park began on September 12, 1870 with the extension of the Delaware, Lackawanna and Western Railroad's Boonton Branch as a freight only stop known as Beavertown. Passenger service began on December 14, 1870. The railroad built the current station depot in 1905.

Station layout
The station has two tracks and one side platform. The station is not compliant with the Americans with Disabilities Act of 1990.

It features a parking lot on both sides, and a waiting room with a bathroom. The station also has a pedestrian crossing with two railroad crossing signs that each have two yellow lights which always blink. The station has two tracks that run through, although only one of those tracks are used for passenger service. Lincoln Park has a roughly -long siding that runs right through the station that is dispatcher controlled. It was formerly used for meets before midday service was discontinued, and no longer sees service by revenue trains.

The station is only served on weekdays.

Bibliography

References

External links

 Station from Comly Road from Google Maps Street View

1870 establishments in New Jersey
Lincoln Park, New Jersey
NJ Transit Rail Operations stations
Former Delaware, Lackawanna and Western Railroad stations
Railway stations in the United States opened in 1870